The House of Dawda Group is a privately owned conglomerate in Uganda.

History 

The group traces its beginnings to 1962, when its founder chairman, Hasmukh Dawda, began a trading business in neighboring Kenya. Having dropped out of school at age 13, he first began trading in confectioneries, before he eventually raised enough capital to start manufacturing his own.

In 1991, the group set up the Britania biscuit manufacturing in Kampala. In 1996, the group acquired the company Uganda Pharmaceuticals Ltd. (UPL, importer of medicine, mainly form India, created by the government in 1973), and sold 70% of it to Libyan investors in 2018. From 1990 to 2004, the group invested $30 millions in development.

In 2002, the group acquired the Kenyan business formerly known as House of Manji, which was under receivership. After reviving the business, it was renamed Manji Food Industries Limited.

Description 

The Dawda Group is mainly involved in the manufacture of fruit juices, beverages, mineral water, confectionery and the distribution of cosmetics, hardware, and pharmaceuticals. The group is also involved in the growing of organic cotton. The conglomerate has its headquarters and majority of its businesses in Uganda, with manufacturing plants in Kenya, and distributes ts products in the countries of the East African Community, as well as exporting to Europe and Asia.

The subsidiary companies of the group include, but are not limited to, the following businesses:

 Britannia Allied Industries Limited: Ntinda, Uganda - Manufacturer of confectioneries, fruit juices, artificial drinks, mineral water and sauces.
 Charms Uganda Limited : Kampala, Uganda - Fast Moving Consumer Goods (FMCG) distributor in Uganda distributor.
 Uganda Pharmaceuticals Limited: Kampala, Uganda - Pharmaceutical distributor and retailer.
 Manji Foods Limited: Nairobi, Kenya - Manufacturer of confectioneries.
 Masaaba Cotton Company: Mbale, Uganda - Exporter of premium roller lint to Europe, the Far East, and Japan.
 Kyoga Cotton Company: Lira, Uganda - Exporter of premium roller lint to Europe, the Far East, and Japan.
 Mika Appliances Ltd: Nairobi, Kenya - Appliance Brand selling various household Appliances.
 One 2 One Logistics: Mombasa, Kenya - Transportation of various goods throughout East Africa.
 Bahari Salt Works Ltd: Mombasa, Kenya - Manufacturing of Cooking Salt.
 DG Properties Ltd: Nairobi, Kenya - Real Estate Developement.

See also
 List of conglomerates in Uganda
 Kampala Capital City Authority
 List of wealthiest people in Uganda

References

Conglomerate companies of Uganda
Kampala District
Food manufacturers of Uganda